Kedavur  is a village in Kozhikode district in the state of Kerala, India.

Demographics
 India census, Kedavur had a population of 23283 with 11373 males and 11910 females.

Transportation
Kedavur village connects to other parts of India through Vatakara town on the west and Kuttiady town on the east.  National highway No.66 passes through Vatakara and the northern stretch connects to Mangalore, Goa and Mumbai.  The southern stretch connects to Cochin and Trivandrum.  The eastern National Highway No.54 going through Kuttiady connects to Mananthavady, Mysore and Bangalore. The nearest airports are at Kannur and Kozhikode.  The nearest railway station is at Vatakara.

References

Villages in Kozhikode district
Kuttiady area